Hamaxia incongrua is a species of tachinid flies in the genus Hamaxia of the family Tachinidae. It is normally found in the Australasian biorealm, but may also be found in the Oriental and Palearctic realms. It is a parasite of numerous Scarabaeidae species, such as Popillia japonica.

External links

Tachinidae